Eileen Brennan (born Verla Eileen Regina Brennen; September 3, 1932 – July 28, 2013) was an American actress. She made her film debut in the satire Divorce American Style (1967), followed by a supporting role in Peter Bogdanovich's The Last Picture Show (1971), which earned her a BAFTA Award nomination for Best Supporting Actress.

She gained further critical acclaim for her role as Captain Doreen Lewis in Private Benjamin, for which she received a nomination for the Academy Award for Best Supporting Actress. She reprised the role in a television adaptation, winning both a Golden Globe and a Primetime Emmy Award.

Brennan also starred in the mystery comedy Clue (1985), and had a minor role in the horror film Jeepers Creepers (2001). She prolifically worked in television, receiving Emmy nominations for her guest roles on Newhart, Thirtysomething, Taxi, and Will & Grace.

Early life
Brennan was born Verla Eileen Regina Brennen on September 3, 1932, in Los Angeles, California, daughter of Regina "Jeanne" Menehan, a silent film actress, and John Gerald Brennen, a doctor. Of Irish descent, she was raised Catholic.

After graduating from high school in California, Brennan relocated to Washington, D.C., to attend Georgetown University, where she was a member of the Mask and Bauble Society. She later relocated to New York City to attend the American Academy of Dramatic Arts, where she was roommates with Rue McClanahan.

Career

Early work and theatre

Brennan began her acting career while attending university, appearing in Georgetown's stage productions of Arsenic and Old Lace. Her exceptional comic skills and romantic soprano voice propelled her from unknown to star in the title role of Rick Besoyan's off-Broadway tongue-in-cheek musical/operetta Little Mary Sunshine (1959), earning Brennan an Obie Award, and its unofficial sequel The Student Gypsy (1963), on Broadway.

She played Annie Sullivan in The Miracle Worker at the 1961 Central City Opera Summer Festival in Central City, Colorado directed by Arthur Penn, who had just won a Tony for his direction of the play on Broadway. She went on to create the role of Irene Molloy in the original Broadway production of Hello, Dolly! (1964).

Brennan's work in theatre attracted attention from television producers in California. Carl Reiner, who was seeking an actress to play the role of Laura Petrie on The Dick Van Dyke Show, flew her from New York to Los Angeles to audition for the part; however, the role was given to Mary Tyler Moore.

Transition to film
Her feature-film debut was in Divorce American Style (1967). She soon became one of the most recognizable (if not precisely identifiable) supporting actresses in film and television. Her roles were usually sympathetic characters, though she played a variety of other character types, including earthy, vulgar and sassy, but occasionally "with a heart of gold". A year after her feature-film debut, she became a semi-regular on the comedy-variety show Rowan & Martin's Laugh-In, but stayed for only two months. Brennan also appeared on Barnaby Jones; episode titled "Blood Relations" (11/28/1975).

Although her name was not often recognized by the general public, she became a favorite of many directors, in particular Peter Bogdanovich. She appeared in Bogdanovich's drama The Last Picture Show as Genevieve (1971), for which she received a BAFTA nomination for best supporting actress.

In 1972, Brennan appeared in an All in the Family episode, "The Elevator Story" (1972), as Angelique McCarthy, followed by a role as brothel madam Billie in George Roy Hill's Academy Award-winning film The Sting (1973) as the confidante of con man Henry Gondorf (Paul Newman). In 1974, she reunited with director Bogdanovich, appearing in his adaptation of the Henry James novella Daisy Miller. Bogdanovich was the only director who made use of her musical talents (before, she sang in performances off Broadway) when he cast her as Cybill Shepherd's crude, fun-loving maid in his musical flop At Long Last Love (1975) (which also starred Madeline Kahn; Brennan and Kahn worked together in two more films: The Cheap Detective and Clue).

Brennan also worked with director Robert Moore and writer Neil Simon, appearing in Murder by Death as Tess Skeffington (1976) and also appearing in The Cheap Detective (1978). Both of these movies also starred James Coco, James Cromwell and Peter Falk. She had a starring role, playing the disc jockey Mother in the film FM (1978), a comedy-drama about life at a rock-music radio station.

In 1980, Brennan received a Best Supporting Actress Oscar nomination for her role as Goldie Hawn's nasty commanding officer in Private Benjamin. She reprised the role in the television adaptation (1981–1983), for which she won an Emmy (supporting actress) as well as a Golden Globe (lead actress). She had one additional Golden Globe nomination and six Emmy nominations. Brennan received an Emmy nomination for her guest-star role in the Taxi episode "Thy Boss's Wife" (1981).

In 1985, Brennan portrayed the iconic Mrs. Peacock in the Paramount Pictures adaptation of Clue.

Later roles
Brennan guest-starred on two Murder, She Wrote episodes, "Old Habits Die Hard" (1987) and "Dear Deadly" (1994), and in 1987, she also appeared in the Magnum, P.I. episode "The Love That Lies". In the 1990s, she appeared in Stella with Bette Midler, Bogdanovich's Texasville (the sequel to The Last Picture Show), and Reckless. She had a recurring role on the sitcom Blossom as the neighbor/confidante of the title character. She also appeared opposite Vincent D'Onofrio in a segment of Boys Life 2, an anthology film about gay men in America.

In 2001, she made a brief appearance in the horror movie Jeepers Creepers, and the following year starred in the dark comedy film Comic Book Villains, with DJ Qualls. In recent years, Brennan had guest-starred in television, including recurring roles as the nosy Mrs. Bink on 7th Heaven and as gruff-acting coach Zandra on Will & Grace. In 2003, director Shawn Levy cast her in a cameo role of a babysitter to Steve Martin and Bonnie Hunt's children in an updated remake of Cheaper by the Dozen. Levy was inspired to cast Brennan after seeing Private Benjamin on television. However, Brennan's cameo was deleted from the actual cut of the movie. Nonetheless, she did receive credit for her role on the deleted scenes special feature of the film's DVD. In 2004, she appeared in the horror film The Hollow as Joan Van Etten. That same year, Brennan was nominated for an Emmy for her performance as Zandra, Jack McFarland's caustic drama teacher, on Will & Grace.

Personal life
From 1968 to 1974, Brennan was married to British poet and photographer David John Lampson, with whom she had two sons: Patrick, a former basketball player turned actor, and Sam, a singer.

In 1982, Brennan was hit by a passing car in Venice Beach while leaving a restaurant with Goldie Hawn and suffered massive injuries. She took three years off work to recover and had to overcome a subsequent addiction to painkillers. She also fell from the stage in 1989 during a production of Annie, breaking a leg. The following year, she was diagnosed with breast cancer, for which she was successfully treated.

Death
Brennan died at her home in Burbank, California, on July 28, 2013, of bladder cancer. She was 80. Her Private Benjamin co-star Goldie Hawn said she was a "brilliant comedian, a powerful dramatic actress and had the voice of an angel". Actor, writer and director Michael McKean, Brennan's co-star in Clue, called Brennan "a brilliant actress, a tough and tender woman and a comic angel".

Filmography

Film

Television

References

Notes

Sources

External links

 
 
 
 
 Eileen Brennan at the American Film Institute
 Eileen Brennan, Who Played Flinty Captain in Private Benjamin, Dies at 80

1932 births
2013 deaths
Actresses from Los Angeles
American film actresses
American musical theatre actresses
American people of Irish descent
American sopranos
American television actresses
Best Musical or Comedy Actress Golden Globe (television) winners
Deaths from bladder cancer
Deaths from cancer in California
Georgetown University alumni
Outstanding Performance by a Supporting Actress in a Comedy Series Primetime Emmy Award winners
Singers from Los Angeles
20th-century American actresses
21st-century American actresses
American Academy of Dramatic Arts alumni